Peter Stein may refer to:
 Peter Stein (director)
 Peter Stein (cinematographer)
 Peter Stein (legal scholar)
 Peter Stein (politician)